Kroczyce Okupne  is a village in the administrative district of Gmina Kroczyce, within Zawiercie County, Silesian Voivodeship, in southern Poland.

References

Kroczyce Okupne